The Ball's blue (Lepidochrysops balli) is a species of butterfly in the family Lycaenidae. It is endemic to South Africa.

The wingspan is 32–34 mm for males and 34–36 mm for females. Adults are on the wing from late November to February.

The larvae feed on Selago divaricata. They burrow into the immature flower-buds of their host plant and consume the interior.

References

Lepidochrysops
Butterflies described in 1985
Endemic butterflies of South Africa
Taxonomy articles created by Polbot